Elaeocarpus elliffii, commonly known as mountain quandong, is a species of flowering plant in the family Elaeocarpaceae and is endemic to north-east Queensland. It is a tree, sometimes with buttress roots at the base of the trunk, narrow egg-shaped leaves often with large domatia, flowers with five white petals with lobed tips, and more or less spherical fruit.

Description
The leaves usually develop up to five large domatia and have wavy-toothed edges.

Taxonomy
Elaeocarpus elliffii was first formally described in 1984 by Bernard Hyland and Mark James Elgar Coode in the Kew Bulletin from material collected in 1970. The specific epithet (elleffii) honours Maurice Elliff (1921–1981), an employee of the herbarium at the Royal Botanic Gardens, Kew from 1977 to 1981.

Distribution and habitat

Conservation status
Mountain quandong is listed as of "least concern" under the Queensland Government Nature Conservation Act 1992.

References

Oxalidales of Australia
elliffii
Flora of Queensland
Plants described in 1984
Endemic flora of Australia